"La spagnola" ("The Spanish Maiden", "The Spanish Girl"), also known as "Stretti stretti, nell'estasi d'amor", is a popular Italian song from the early 20th century.

History 
The song is dated to 1906 and was written by Neapolitan "tarantellist" Vincenzo Di Chiara.

Lyrics 
According to the official journal of the National Association of Teachers of Singing, the song is about "a Spanish beauty who believes in her powers of love".

Recordings 

The performers of this song included Beniamino Gigli.

References

External links 

 

Italian songs
1906 songs
Gigliola Cinquetti songs
1973 singles